Hambre nuestra de cada día ("Our Daily Hunger") is a 1959 Mexican drama film. It was directed by Rogelio A. González and written by Luis Alcoriza. It was entered into the 1st Moscow International Film Festival.

Cast
Pedro Armendáriz
Rosita Quintana
Ignacio Lopez Tarso
Carlos Ancira
Emma Fink
Omar Jasso
Diana Ochoa
Luis Aragón
Guillermo Bravo Sosa
Luz María Núñez

References

External links
 

1950s Spanish-language films
Films directed by Rogelio A. González
1959 drama films
1959 films
Mexican black-and-white films
1950s Mexican films